Martha Holmes is a BAFTA Award-winning BBC Television producer and writer known for her wildlife documentaries.

Biography
Holmes studied for a PhD in marine biology at the University of York.

She started work at the BBC in 1988 hosting a live underwater broadcast from the northern Red Sea for Reefwatch, and the award-winning wildlife adventures series Sea Trek (which she hosted with American born documentary filmmaker the late Mike deGruy).

She joined the production team for Life in the Freezer and produced BBC Wildlife Specials episode on the polar bear for which she won the Best Factual Photography award at the 1998 BAFTAs. She was awarded the Royal Geographical Society's Cherry Kearton Medal and Award in 1999.

The Good Fish Guide
Holmes joined a conservationist campaign to boycott 20 varieties of fish because of the impact of over-fishing on their numbers and the environment.

She wrote the introduction to "The Good Fish Guide" which accompanied the campaign.

Filmography
 Reefwatch (1988), presenter
 Sea Trek (1991), presenter
 Life in the Freezer (1993) production team
 BBC Wildlife Specials: Polar Bear (1997), producer
 The Blue Planet (2001), producer
 The Nile (2004), series producer
 The Man-Eating Lions of Njombe (2005), producer
 The Man-Eating Leopard of Rudraprayag (2005), producer
 The Man-Eating Wolves of Gysinge (2005), producer
 The Making of 'Deep Blue' (2006), segment producer

Bibliography

References

External links
 Biography at BBC Nature
 Nile at BBC Press Office

English television personalities
Living people
Alumni of the University of York
Year of birth missing (living people)
People educated at Windlesham House School